Ogo Bodhu Shundori (English: Hey Beautiful Bride) is a 1981 Bengali comedy film, directed by Salil Dutta. It was the last film of the iconic Bengali actor Uttam Kumar, who died during production. A lookalike, Prabir Kumar, was brought in to stand in for Uttam Kumar during the final sections of the film.  

The film was produced by RD Bansal. The music was composed by Bappi Lahiri. This was the second Bengali film after Dadu and the only Uttam Kumar film where Lahiri composed music. The movie is a Bengali reworking of the story of Pygmalion, heavily drawing upon the British musical My Fair Lady.

Plot
Gagan (Uttam Kumar) does not like to socialise, while his wife Chitra (Sumitra Mukherjee) loved attending parties. One day, Chitra's friend Lola invites her to a party. In the meanwhile, the Kolkata Book Fair takes off and Gagan wanted to go. Savitri (Moushumi Chatterjee) lived with her uncle from an early age. One day, her uncle sold her for some money, from where Savitri escaped and took shelter in Gagan's house. When Gagan's wife saw Savitri in Gagan's reading room, she went to her grandfather's house. Gagan and Abalakanta (Santosh Dutta) helped Savitri learn etiquette and the ways of genteel society.

One day, Gagan thinks of an alliance between Savitri and Abalakanta. But Savitri did not agree to marry Abalakanta. In the meanwhile, Sandip (Ranjit Mallick) came and becomes confused on seeing Savitri. Gagan then realises about their love. So he arranges Sandip and Savitri's marriage in his house. But Chitra's servant told her that Gagan was to marry Savitri. So Chitra comes to the house with her grandfather. Finally, Chitra realises that the bridegroom was her brother Sandip. The film thus ends on a happy note.

Cast
 Uttam Kumar - Prof. Gagan sen
 Moushumi Chatterjee - Sabitri
 Santosh Dutta - Abalakanta
 Sumitra Mukherjee - Chitra
 Ranjit Mallick - Sandeep
 Bikash Roy - Sandeep and Chitra's grandfather
 Meenakshi Goswami - Lola Bose
 Haradhan Bandopadhyay - Lola Bose's husband
 Chinmoy Roy
 Premangshu Bose - Sabitri's uncle

Production
The film was based on the 1913 English play Pygmalion of George Barnand Shaw which is it'self based on the super hit British musical comedy film called My Fair Lady. The legendary actor and the matinee idol of Bengal Mahanayak Uttam Kumar died during the production.

Director Salil Dutta remembering the last two days of Uttam Kumar shooting. In the day July 22 There is a shot after lunch break suddenly Uttam closed his eyes with his hand on his forehead, all eyes were on Uttam. Blood was seen coming from the forehead. Director Salil Dutta quickly went ahead and seated Uttam. That scene was scene of throwing a Jaipuri ashtsry. A piece of it stuck on the door and hit his on the forehead. Director quickly packed up and called the doctor. That is a private doctor of Uttam, came in time, he saw and said this is nothing and Left some medicine. Then director want to stop the shoot for that day  but Uttam protested against stop the shooting. Uttam said When going to work, then such small and big incidents will happen. Then Uttam starts the shooting again.

On 23rd July, while Uttam going for the shooting, he noticed that his favorite tap recorder was not in the car. Everyday in his free time, he used to listen songs and recorded speeches by that tape recorder. He couldn't be found even after searching every place. This incident hurt him a lot. He came to the shooting spot with very sadness. The last scene of the film which he shot that day was Sumitra Mukherjee who playing the role of his wife she was going to his father house in anger, such was the scene in the picture Uttam repeatedly trying to stop his wife by shaving his beard and said his last dialogue Amio Dekhe Nebo Amar Naam Gogon Sen. At that time he was having a heart at his hand goes between his chest while speaking the dialogue.

Soundtrack

Trivia
In 2010 a Bengali film was made in a same title directed by Sunanda Mitra. The film starring Shreelekha Mitra, Sabitri Chatterjee, Babul Supriyo, Monami Ghosh and Kharaj Mukherjee. This is not a remake film of original. It's a tribute to Uttam Kumar and original Ogo Badhu Sundari film. In this film Babul played same name of Uttam Kumar as Uttam Kumar Chatterjee who is a die hard Uttam Kumar fan. There is also three song used in the movie from Uttam Kumar's film.

References

External links

www.gomolo.in 

1981 films
Bengali-language Indian films
1980s Bengali-language films
Films directed by Salil Dutta